George Lewis "Moe" Radovich (May 5, 1929 – June 18, 2004) was an American professional basketball player and college head coach. Radovich was selected in the 1952 NBA draft by the Philadelphia Warriors after a collegiate career at Wyoming. He played for the Warriors in November 1952 in only four games, averaging 3.5 points, 0.3 rebounds and 2.0 assists per contest. Radovich was also a college coach for Fullerton Junior College, and Wyoming.

Early life
Radovich served as a lieutenant in the U.S. Army for two years during the Korean War.

Head coaching record

References

External links
University of Wyoming Hall of Fame entry

1929 births
2004 deaths
United States Army personnel of the Korean War
American Basketball League (1925–1955) players
American men's basketball players
Basketball coaches from Wyoming
Basketball players from Wyoming
Cal State Fullerton Titans men's basketball coaches
Sheridan Generals men's basketball coaches
Junior college men's basketball players in the United States
People from Hot Springs County, Wyoming
Philadelphia Warriors draft picks
Philadelphia Warriors players
Point guards
Basketball players from San Diego
United States Army officers
Wayne State Wildcats men's basketball coaches
Wilkes-Barre Barons players
Wyoming Cowboys basketball coaches
Wyoming Cowboys basketball players